Kuntisuyu or Kunti Suyu (Quechua kunti west, suyu region, part of a territory, each of the four regions which formed the Inca Empire, "western region") was the southwestern provincial region of the Inca Empire. Kuntisuyu was the smallest suyu of all and was located along the southern coast of modern Peru, extending into the highlands towards Cusco. Along with Qullasuyu, it was part of the Urin Suyukuna or "Lower Quarters" of the empire.

Wamani

Each suyu was divided into wamani, or provinces. Kuntisuyu included the wamani of:
Acari
Angará
Arequipa or Ariqipa
Atico
Aymara
Camaná, inhabited by the Maje people
Caravelí
Cavana or Qhawana
Chanca or Chanka, also called Andahuayla or Andawaylla.
Chilque, whose people were “Incas by privilege”.
Choclococha or Chuqlluqucha
Chocoruo or Chukurpu
Chumbivilca or Chumpiwillka
Contisuyo or Kuntisuyu, including the Allqa (Alca), Kutawasi (Cotahuasi) and Aruni peoples
Cotabamba or Kutapampa
Huanca or Warka, including three saya
Ica or Ika
Nazca or Naska
Ocoña or Ukhuña
Parinacocha or Pariwanaqucha
Quechua or Qhichwa
Quilca or Qillqa
Rucana or Ruk'ana
Sora, divided into three saya
Vilcas or Willka
Yanahuara or Yanawara, whose people were “Incas by privilege”
Yauca or Yawka

See also
Organization of the Inca Empire

References

Subdivisions of the Inca Empire